Cameron Meyer (born 11 January 1988) is an Australian former professional racing cyclist, who competed as a professional from 2009 to 2022.

Career
Born in Viveash, Western Australia, Meyer started cycling at the age of 13 in 2001 and first represented his country at the World Junior Track Championships in 2005. He was an Australian Institute of Sport scholarship holder.

Meyer won his first senior World Championship in the Points Race in Pruszków, Poland. In 2009 he was selected to ride the Giro d'Italia. He won the time-trial event at the 2010 Australian National Road Race Championships.

Meyer's younger brother Travis Meyer is also a professional racing cyclist, and was one of 's first signings alongside Cameron and fellow Australian Jack Bobridge.

After a short break, he decided to enter the Six Day London track race with Callum Scotson and placed third overall. He subsequently competed for Australia at the 2017 UCI Track Cycling World Championships, where he took two golds in the points race and as part of the Australian team pursuit squad, and rode for the Australian national team on the road during 2017, winning the Dwars door de Vlaamse Ardennen and scoring top five finishes in the Cadel Evans Great Ocean Road Race and the Herald Sun Tour. In August 2017,  announced that Meyer would rejoin them on a three-year contract from 2018, with a focus on winning the madison at the 2018 Commonwealth Games and the 2020 Summer Olympics. In 2020 and 2021 he won the Australian National Road Race Championships.

Meyer retired from the sport in September 2022, after thirteen years as a professional. Meyer then became the coach for British Cycling's track women's endurance team.

Major results

Track

2005
 1st  Madison (with Adam O'Connor), National Junior Championships
2006
 UCI World Junior Championships
1st  Individual pursuit
1st  Madison (with Travis Meyer)
1st  Team pursuit
 National Junior Championships
1st  Individual pursuit
1st  Points race
1st  Team pursuit
1st  Madison (with Travis Meyer)
2007
 UCI World Cup Classics
3rd Points race, Sydney
3rd Points race, Beijing
2008
 UCI World Cup Classics
1st Points race, Los Angeles
3rd Team pursuit, Copenhagen
2009
 UCI World Championships
1st  Points race
2nd  Madison (with Leigh Howard)
2nd  Team pursuit
2010
 UCI World Championships
1st  Madison (with Leigh Howard)
1st  Points race
1st  Team pursuit
 Commonwealth Games
1st  Team pursuit
1st  Points race
1st  Scratch
 UCI World Cup Classics, Melbourne
1st Madison (with Leigh Howard)
1st Team pursuit
2011
 UCI World Championships
1st  Madison (with Leigh Howard)
2nd  Points race
 Oceania Championships
1st  Madison (with Leigh Howard)
1st  Team pursuit
 1st  Madison (with Leigh Howard), National Championships
2012
 1st  Points race, UCI World Championships
2016
 1st  Madison (with Sam Welsford), National Championships
 2nd Madison (with Callum Scotson), UCI World Cup, Glasgow
 3rd Six Days of London (with Callum Scotson)
2017
 UCI World Championships
1st  Points race
1st  Team pursuit
2nd  Madison (with Callum Scotson)
 National Championships
1st  Points race
1st  Team pursuit
2nd Individual pursuit
 1st Six Days of London (with Callum Scotson)
2018
 UCI World Championships
1st  Points race
3rd  Madison (with Callum Scotson)

Road

2005
 7th Time trial, UCI World Junior Championships
2006
 National Junior Championships
1st  Road race
2nd Time trial
 5th Time trial, UCI World Junior Championships
2007
 1st  Overall Tour of Tasmania
1st Stages 2 & 5
 1st Stage 3 Tour of Gippsland
 2nd Road race, National Under-23 Championships
2008
 1st  Overall Tour of Japan
 3rd  Time trial, UCI World Under-23 Championships
 3rd Gran Premio Industrie del Marmo
2009
 2nd Time trial, National Championships
2010
 1st  Time trial, National Championships
 3rd Overall Tour of Oman
2011
 1st  Time trial, National Championships
 1st  Overall Tour Down Under
1st  Young rider classification
1st Stage 4
 1st  Overall Tour de Perth
 3rd OCBC Cycle Singapore
2012
 2nd Time trial, National Championships
 3rd  Team time trial, UCI World Championships
 10th Overall Tirreno–Adriatico
1st Stage 1 (TTT)
2013
 1st  Road race, Oceania Championships
 1st  Criterium, National Championships
 1st  Mountains classification, Circuit de la Sarthe
 1st Stage 4 (TTT) Tour de France
 5th Overall Tour of California
 5th Overall Tour of Turkey
 10th Overall Tour de Suisse
1st Stage 1 (ITT)
2014
 1st Stage 2 Tour de Suisse
 1st Stage 1 (TTT) Giro d'Italia
 4th Road race, National Championships
 9th Overall Herald Sun Tour
2015
 1st  Overall Herald Sun Tour
1st  Sprints classification
1st Stage 1
 4th Prueba Villafranca de Ordizia
  Combativity award Stage 1 Vuelta a España
2016
 2nd Road race, National Championships
2017
 1st Dwars door de Vlaamse Ardennen
 3rd Overall Rás Tailteann
 3rd Cadel Evans Great Ocean Road Race
 4th Overall Herald Sun Tour
 7th Overall Tour of China I
 7th Overall Tour of Quanzhou Bay
2018
 Commonwealth Games
1st  Time trial
9th Road race
 1st Stage 2 Tour of Britain
 2nd Overall Herald Sun Tour
2019
 1st Stage 1b (TTT) Settimana Internazionale di Coppi e Bartali
 National Championships
3rd Road race
3rd Time trial
2020
 1st  Road race, National Championships
2021
 1st  Road race, National Championships

Grand Tour general classification results timeline

References

Interview on Cyclingresults.net

External links

Profile on Cycling Australia website 

1988 births
Living people
Australian male cyclists
Cyclists at the 2008 Summer Olympics
Cyclists at the 2018 Commonwealth Games
Olympic cyclists of Australia
Cyclists from Melbourne
Commonwealth Games gold medallists for Australia
Cyclists at the 2010 Commonwealth Games
UCI Track Cycling World Champions (men)
Australian Institute of Sport cyclists
Tour de Suisse stage winners
Commonwealth Games medallists in cycling
Australian track cyclists
Cyclists from Perth, Western Australia
Medallists at the 2010 Commonwealth Games
Medallists at the 2018 Commonwealth Games